The  is a 4-6-4 wheel arrangement steam locomotive type born from the rebuilding of 47 out of 173 surplus Class C59 4-6-2 Pacific locomotives. Hideo Shima redesigned 47 C59s between 1953 and 1961 at the JNR Hamamatsu and Kōriyama factories. 39 locos were rebuilt from pre-war C59s, while 8 were rebuilt from post-war variants and renumbered to C60 101 to 108. With the spread of electrification, lower axle loads and greater versatility had become more important requirements than sheer pulling power, so an additional trailing axle was included to reduce the heavy axle load of the C59 and allow more widespread use.

The class was most active on local and express passenger services in the Tohoku and Kyushu regions, and locos were to be seen operating in multiple (double- and even triple-headers) with Class C61s and Class D51s on both passenger and freight workings north of Morioka on the Tōhoku Main Line.

The class survived until 1971. Only one C60 is preserved: C60 1 (formerly C59 27) is in a park in Sendai.

Locomotive Build details

See also
 Japan Railways locomotive numbering and classification
JNR Class C61
JNR Class C62

References 

Steam locomotives of Japan
4-6-4 locomotives
1067 mm gauge locomotives of Japan
Preserved steam locomotives of Japan
Railway locomotives introduced in 1953
Passenger locomotives
Rebuilt locomotives